Adrien Ménager (born 10 March 1991) is a French professional footballer who plays as a midfielder for Saint-Pryvé Saint-Hilaire FC.

Career
Ménager made his professional debut with Châteauroux on 10 May 2011, coming on as a substitute for Romain Grange in the 1–2 defeat to Angers.

External links

Adrien Ménager profile at foot-national.com

1991 births
Living people
People from Pithiviers
French footballers
Association football midfielders
LB Châteauroux players
Ligue 2 players
Sportspeople from Loiret
Footballers from Centre-Val de Loire